"Can You Give It?" is a song from English Indie Rock band The Maccabees, released as the second single from their second album Wall of Arms on 5 July 2009. The song peaked at number 129 on the UK Singles Chart.

Music video
A music video to accompany the release of "Can You Give It?" was first released onto YouTube on 4 June 2009 at a total length of three minutes and nineteen seconds.

Track listing

Charts

Release history

References

2009 singles
The Maccabees (band) songs
2009 songs
Polydor Records singles